Beloved Hymns is a studio album by Bing Crosby  released in 1951 featuring eight hymns recorded with the Ken Darby Choir and organ accompaniment on May 6, 1949.

Reception
Crosby researcher Fred Reynolds said of the recording session at which all eight hymns were recorded, “They were all sung devoutly without any pretence of 'performance,' but nevertheless gave added support to Martin Luther’s dictum that the devil should not have all the best tunes.”

Billboard reviewed some of the individual songs released as 78 rpm records.

"What a Friend We Have In Jesus" - Choir and organ support Bing ably as he delivers a beautiful hymn simply, straightforwardly and with deep warmth.

"He Leadeth Me" - Bing does this hymn with eminent strength and full affection for the chore. Should make for big sales in a quiet way for this Decca Faith disking.

"O Lord, I Am Not Worthy" - Bing rarely has sung better and with more feeling than he shows on this hymnal selection.

Album releases
The songs were featured on a 10” vinyl LP numbered DL 5351 and in a 4-disc 45rpm box set numbered 9-258.

LP track listing

References

Bing Crosby albums
1951 albums
Decca Records albums